Asimina Vanakara (born 14 July 1979) is a Greek athlete. She competed in the women's heptathlon at the 2000 Summer Olympics.

References

1979 births
Living people
Athletes (track and field) at the 2000 Summer Olympics
Greek heptathletes
Olympic athletes of Greece
Athletes from Larissa